Gordon F. Royle is a professor at the School of Mathematics and Statistics  at The University of Western Australia.

Royle is the co-author (with Chris Godsil) of the book Algebraic Graph Theory (Springer Verlag, 2001).
Royle is also known for his research into the mathematics of Sudoku and his search for the Sudoku puzzle with the smallest number of entries that has a unique solution.

Royle earned his Ph.D. in 1987 from the University of Western Australia under the supervision of Cheryl Praeger and Brendan McKay.

References 

Living people
Australian mathematicians
Graph theorists
University of Western Australia alumni
Academic staff of the University of Western Australia
Year of birth missing (living people)